"Toujours pas d'amour" is a song recorded by French singer Priscilla Betti. It was released on February 3, 2004 in France, Switzerland and Belgium (Wallonia) as the first single from her third album Une fille comme moi. The single reached the top five on the French singles chart and was certified Silver by the SNEP.

Writing and music video

As for Priscilla's previous singles, the song was composed by Philippe Osman (music, arrangements) and Bertrand Châtenet (lyrics, mixing), who had also worked for Mylène Farmer.

The music video was partly produced as an animated feature. Priscilla is in the street with her friends and takes people she meets in a party in which they become animated characters.

The remix featuring as second track on the CD single is also available on the album Une Fille comme moi, as eleventh track.

Chart performances
In France, the single started at number 17 on 1 February 2004 before climbed in the top ten. It reached a peak of number five, then almost did not stop to drop on the chart. It totalled five weeks in the top ten, 16 weeks in the top 50 and 22 weeks in the top 100. It was certified Silver disc by the SNEP and ranked 47th on the End of the Year Chart.

In Belgium (Wallonia), the single charted for 15 weeks, from 21 February 2004. It remained at the bottom of the chart, peaking at number 21 in the seventh week.

With this single, Priscilla achieved her highest position in Switzerland. It featured for 11 weeks on the chart, including four weeks in the top 50. It peaked at number 39 in the fifth week, on 14 March 2004.

Track listing

Personnel
 Lyrics by Bertrand Châtenet
 Music by Philippe Osman
 Arrangement, programmation and all instruments by Philippe Osman
 Mixing by Bertrand Châtenet
 Vocals by Priscilla
 Remixed version by Ghost
 Produced by B.Châtenet, P.Osman and P.Debort
 Produced by Patrick Debort and Denys Limon for Cap Mistral Corporation
 Edited by Mache Prod
 Recorded at Guillaume Tell and Mega studios in Suresnes

Charts and sales

Peak positions

Year-end charts

Certifications

References

2003 songs
2004 singles
Priscilla Betti songs
Jive Records singles
Songs written by Philippe Osman
Songs written by Bertrand Châtenet